Academic writing or scholarly writing is nonfiction writing produced as part of academic work in accordance with the standards and disciplines of each academic subject, including reports on empirical fieldwork or research in facilities for the natural sciences or social sciences, monographs in which scholars analyze culture, propose new theories, or develop interpretations from archives, as well as undergraduate versions of all of these.

Though the tone, style, content, and organization of academic writing vary across genres and across publication methods, nearly all academic writing shares a relatively formal prose register, frequent reference to other academic work, and the use of fairly stable rhetorical moves to define the scope of the project, situate it in the relevant research, and to advance a new contribution.

Academic style 
Academic writing often features prose register that is conventionally characterized by "evidence...that the writer(s) have been persistent, open-minded, and disciplined in the study"; that prioritizes "reason over emotion or sensual perception"; and that imagines a reader who is "coolly rational, reading for information, and intending to formulate a reasoned response."

Three linguistic patterns that correspond to these goals, across fields and genres, include the following:

 a balance of caution and certainty, or a balance of hedging and boosting;
 explicit cohesion through a range of cohesive ties and moves; and 
 compression, or dense noun phrases to add detail rather than more dependent clauses.

The stylistic means of achieving these conventions can differ by academic discipline, which helps explain the distinctive sounds of, for example, writing in history versus engineering or physics versus philosophy. Biber and Gray suggested that there are significant differences with regards to complexity in academic writing in humanities versus science, with humanities writing often focused on structural elaboration, and sciences, on structural compression.

One theory that attempts to account for these differences in writing is known as "discourse communities".

Criticism 

Academic style, particularly in humanities, has often been criticized for being too full of jargon and hard to understand by the general public. In 2022, Joelle Renstrom argued that the COVID-19 pandemic has had a negative impact on academic writing and that many scientific articles now "contain more jargon than ever, which encourages misinterpretation, political spin, and a declining public trust in the scientific process."

Discourse community

A discourse community is essentially a group of people that shares mutual interests and beliefs. "It establishes limits and regularities...who may speak, what may be spoken, and how it is to be said; in addition [rules] prescribe what is true and false, what is reasonable and what foolish, and what is meant and what not."

The concept of a discourse community is vital to academic writers across nearly all disciplines, for the academic writer's purpose is to influence how their community understands its field of study: whether by maintaining, adding to, revising, or contesting what that community regards as "known" or "true." Academic writers have strong incentives to follow conventions established by their community in order for their attempts to influence this community to be legible.

Discourse community constraints
Constraints are the discourse community's written and unwritten conventions about what a writer can say and how he or she can say it. They define what is an acceptable argument. Each discourse community expects to see a writer construct his or her argument using their conventional style of language and vocabulary, and they expect a writer to use the established intertext within the discourse community as the building blocks for his or her argument.

Writing for a discourse community
In order for a writer to become familiar with some of the constraints of the discourse community they are writing for, across most discourses communities, writers will:
 Identify the novelty of their position
 Make a claim, or thesis
 Acknowledge prior work and situate their claim in a disciplinary context
 Offer warrants for one's view based on community-specific arguments and procedures

Each of theses above are constructed differently depending on the discourse community the writer is in. For example, the way a claim is made in a high school paper would look very different from the way a claim is made in a college composition class. It is important for the academic writer to familiarize himself or herself with the conventions of the discourse community by reading and analyzing other works, so that the writer is best able to communicate his or her ideas.

Writing Across the Curriculum designates educational programs that support improving student writing in the different disciplinary communities, through writing centers, courses in writing programs, and disciplinary courses with substantial writing requirements. The Writing Across the Curriculum Clearinghouse provides resources for such programs at all levels of education.

Novel argument
Within discourse communities, academic writers build on top of the ideas established by previous writers.

Good academic writers know the importance of researching previous work from within the discourse community and using this work to build their own claims. By taking these ideas and expanding upon them or applying them in a new way, a writer is able to make their novel argument.

Intertextuality
Intertextuality is the combining of past writings into original, new pieces of text. Usually attributed to Julia Kristeva, the concept of intertextuality is helpful for understanding that all texts are necessarily related to prior texts through a network of explicit or implicit links, allusions, repetitions, acknowledged or unacknowledged inspiration, and direct quotations. Writers (often unwittingly) make use of what has previously been written and thus some degree of borrowing is inevitable. One of the most salient features of academic writing irrespective of discipline is its unusually explicit conventions for marking intertextuality through citation and bibliography. Conventions for these markings (e.g., MLA, APA, IEEE, Chicago, etc.) vary by discourse community.

Summarizing and integrating other texts in academic writing is often metaphorically described as "entering the conversation," as described by Kenneth Burke:

Key elements
There are a number of areas of importance in all academic and scholarly writing. While some areas, such as the use of appropriate references and the avoidance of plagiarism, are not open to challenge, other elements, such as the appropriate style, are contested.

Style
Contrary to stereotype, published academic research is not particularly syntactically complex; it is instead a fairly low-involvement register characterized by the modification of nominal elements through hedging and refining elaborations, often presented as sequences of objects of prepositions such as what, where, when, and whom.
Logical structure
Writing should be organised in a manner which demonstrates clarity of thought.
Appropriate references
Generally speaking, the range and organization of references illustrate the author's awareness of the current state of knowledge in the field (including major current disagreements or controversies); typically the expectation is that these references will be formatted in the relevant disciplinary citation system.
Bibliography
Typically this lists those materials read as background, evidencing wider reading, and will include the sources of individual citations.
Avoidance of plagiarism
Plagiarism, the "wrongful appropriation of another author's language, thoughts, ideas, or expressions", and the representation of them as one's own original work, is considered academic dishonesty, and can lead to severe consequences.

Academic genres
Academic writing encompasses many different genres, indicating the many different kinds of authors, audiences and activities engaged in the academy and the variety of kinds of messages sent among various people engaged in the academy.  The partial list below indicates the complexity of academic writing and the academic world it is part of.

By researchers for other researchers 
 Scholarly monograph, in many types and varieties
 Chapter in an edited volume
 Book Review
 Conference paper
 Essay; usually short, between 1,500 and 6,000 words in length
 Explication; usually a short factual note explaining some part of a particular work; e.g. its terminology, dialect, allusions or coded references
 Literature review or Review Essay; a summary and careful comparison of previous academic work published on a specific topic
 Research Article
 Research proposal
 Site description and plan (e.g. in archeology)
 Technical report
 Translation
 Journal article (e.g. History Today); usually presenting a digest of recent research

Technical or administrative forms
 Brief; short summary, often instructions for a commissioned work
 Peer review report
 Proposal for research or for a book
 White paper; detailed technical specifications and/or performance report

Collating the work of others
 Anthology; collection, collation, ordering and editing of the work of others
 Catalogue raisonné; the definitive collection of the work of a single artist, in book form
 Collected works; often referred to as the 'critical edition'. The definitive collection of the work of a single writer or poet, in book form, carefully purged of publishers errors and later forgeries, etc.
 Monograph or exhibition catalog; usually containing exemplary works, and a scholarly essay. Sometime contains new work by a creative writer, responding to the work
 Transcribing, selecting and ordering oral testimony (e.g. oral history recordings)

Research and planning
 Empirical research
 Experimental plan
 Laboratory report
 Raw data collection plan
 Research proposal, including research questions
 Structured notes

Newer forms
 Collaborative writing, especially using the internet
 Hypertext, often incorporating new media and multimedia forms within the text
 Performative writing (see also: belles-lettres)

By graduate students for their advisors and committees

 Doctoral Dissertation, completed over a number of years, often in excess of 20,000 words in length 
 Masters Thesis  (in some regions referred to as Masters Dissertation), often completed within a year and between 6,000 and 20,000 words in length.
 Thesis or Dissertation Proposal

By undergraduate students for their instructors
 Research Paper; longer essay involving library research, 3000 to 6000 words in length
Book report
Exam Essays

By instructors for students 
 Exam questions
 Instructional pamphlet, or hand-out, or reading list
 Presentations; usually short, often illustrated
 Syllabus

Summaries of knowledge for researchers, students or general public
 Annotated bibliography
 Annotated catalogue, often of an individual or group's papers and/or library
 Simplified graphical representation of knowledge; e.g. a map, or refining a display generated from a database. There will often be a 'key' or written work incorporated with the final work
 Creating a timeline or chronological plan. There will often be a 'key' or written work incorporated with the final work
 Devising a classification scheme; e.g. for animals, or newly arisen sub-cultures, or a radically new style of design
 Encyclopedia entry or Handbook chapter

Disseminating knowledge outside the academy
 Call for papers
 Documentary film script or TV script or radio script
 Obituary
 Opinion; an academic may sometimes be asked to give an expert written opinion, for use in a legal case before a court of law
 Newspaper opinion article
 Public speech or lecture
 Review of a book, film, exhibition, event, etc.
 Think-tank pamphlet, position paper, or briefing paper

Personal forms often for general public 
These are acceptable to some academic disciplines, e.g. Cultural studies, Fine art, Feminist studies, Queer theory, Literary studies
 Artist's book or Chapbook
 Autobiography
 Belles-lettres; stylish or aesthetic writing on serious subjects, often with reference to one's personal experience
 Commonplace book
 Diary or Weblog
 Memoire; usually a short work, giving one's own memories of a famous person or event
 Notebooks

Format
A commonly recognized format for presenting original research in the social and applied sciences is known as IMRD, an initialism that refers to the usual ordering of subsections:
 Introduction (Overview of relevant research and objective of current study)
 Method (Assumptions, questions, procedures described in replicable or at least reproducible detail)
 Results (Presentation of findings; often includes visual displays of quantitative data charts, plots)
and
 Discussion (Analysis, Implications, Suggested Next Steps)

Standalone methods sections are atypical in presenting research in the humanities; other common formats in the applied and social sciences are IMRAD (which offers an "Analysis" section separate from the implications presented in the "Discussion" section) and IRDM (found in some engineering subdisciplines, which features Methods at the end of the document).

Other common sections in academic documents are:
 Abstract
 Acknowledgments
 Indices
 Bibliography
 List of references
 Appendix/Addendum, any addition to a document

See also

 Academia
 Academic authorship
 Academic ghostwriting
 Academic journal
 Academic publishing
 Author editing
 Creative class
 Criticism
 Expository writing
 Knowledge worker
 Persuasive writing or rhetoric
 Publishing
 Research paper mill
 Rhetorical device
 Scientific writing
 Scientific publishing
 Scholarly method
 Scholarly skywriting
 Style guide

References

Further reading

General
 C. Bazerman, J. Little, T. Chavkin, D. Fouquette, L. Bethel, and J. Garufis (2005). Writing across the curriculum. Parlor Press and WAC Clearinghouse. https://wac.colostate.edu/books/referenceguides/bazerman-wac/
 C. Bazerman & D. Russell (1994). Landmark essays in writing across the curriculum.  Davis, CA: Hermagoras Press.
 
 
 Borg, Erik (2003). 'Discourse Community', English Language Teaching (ELT) Journal, Vol. 57, Issue 4, pp. 398–400
 
 Coinam, David (2004). 'Concordancing Yourself: A Personal Exploration of Academic Writing', Language Awareness, Vol. 13, Issue 1, pp. 49–55
 
 Goodall, H. Lloyd, Jr. (2000). Writing Qualitative Inquiry: Self, Stories, and Academic Life (Walnut Creek, CA: Left Coast Press)
 Johns, Ann M. (1997). Text, Role and Context: Developing Academic Literacies (Cambridge: Cambridge University Press)
 King, Donald W., Carol Tenopir, Songphan Choemprayong, and Lei Wu (2009). 'Scholarly Journal Information Seeking and Reading Patterns of Faculty at Five U.S. Universities', Learned Publishing, Vol. 22, Issue 2, pp. 126–144
 Kouritzin, Sandra G., Nathalie A. C Piquemal, and Renee Norman, eds (2009). Qualitative Research: Challenging the Orthodoxies in Standard Academic Discourse(s) (New York: Routledge)
 Lincoln, Yvonna S, and Norman K Denzin (2003). Turning Points in Qualitative Research: Tying Knots in a Handkerchief (Walnut Creek, CA; Oxford: AltaMira Press)
 Luey, Beth (2010). Handbook for Academic Authors, 5th edn (Cambridge: Cambridge University Press)
 Murray, Rowena, and Sarah Moore (2006). The Handbook of Academic Writing: A Fresh Approach (Maidenhead: Open University Press)
 Nash, Robert J. (2004). Liberating Scholarly Writing: The Power of Personal Narrative (New York; London: Teachers College Press)
 Paltridge, Brian (2004). 'Academic Writing', Language Teaching, Vol. 37, Issue 2, pp. 87–105
 Pelias, Ronald J. (1999). Writing Performance: Poeticizing the Researcher's Body (Carbondale, IL: Southern Illinois University Press)
 Prior, Paul A. (1998). Writing/Disciplinarity: A Sociohistoric Account of Literate Activity in the Academy (Mahwah, NJ; London: Lawrence Erlbaum)
 Rhodes, Carl and Andrew D. Brown (2005). 'Writing Responsibly: Narrative Fiction and Organization Studies', The Organization: The Interdisciplinary Journal of Organizations and Society, Vol. 12, Issue 4, pp. 467–491
 Richards, Janet C., and Sharon K. Miller (2005). Doing Academic Writing in Education: Connecting the Personal and the Professional (Mahwah, NJ: Lawrence Erlbaum)
 
The University of Sydney. (2019). Academic Writing.

Architecture, design and art
 Crysler, C. Greig (2002). Writing Spaces: Discourses of Architecture, Urbanism and the Built Environment (London: Routledge)
 Francis, Pat (2009). Inspiring Writing in Art and Design: Taking a Line for a Write (Bristol; Chicago: Intellect)
 Frayling, Christopher (1993). 'Research in Art and Design', Royal College of Art Research Papers, Vol. 1, Issue 1, pp. 1–5
 Piotrowski, Andrzej (2008). 'The Spectacle of Architectural Discourses', Architectural Theory Review, Vol. 13, Issue 2, pp. 130–144

Bibliography
 Baldo, Shannon. "Elves and Extremism: the use of Fantasy in the Radical Environmentalist Movement." Young Scholars in Writing: Undergraduate Research in Writing and Rhetoric 7 (Spring 2010): 108–15. Print.
 Greene, Stuart. "Argument as Conversation: The Role of Inquiry in Writing a Researched Argument." n. page. Print.
 Kantz, Margaret. "Helping Students Use Textual Sources Persuasively." College English 52.1 (1990): 74–91. Print.
 Porter, James. "Intertextuality and the Discourse Community."Rhetoric Review. 5.1 (1986): 34–47. Print.

Writing
Second language writing